UEFA Euro 2004 is the official licensed video game of UEFA Euro 2004 football tournament hosted in Portugal. The game was developed by EA Canada and published by EA Sports. It was released for Microsoft Windows, Xbox and PlayStation 2.

It is the second game from EA Sports based on the quadrennial UEFA European Championship and features all 51 national teams from the respective qualifying round.

The commentary is provided by John Motson and Ally McCoist.

Gameplay

UEFA Euro 2004 uses a tweaked and improved version of the graphics engine from FIFA 2004 and introduces many new gameplay features and game modes to both the UEFA Euro and FIFA series.

Development
Electronic Arts made the game's development public on February 6, 2004, when it announced that it had signed an agreement with UEFA to develop, publish and distribute the official game based on UEFA Euro 2004 championship that would begin on June 12 of that same year in Portugal.

The game was developed by EA Canada, the studio behind the development of the FIFA series of video games.

For the soundtrack, the developers specifically chose rock-based tracks due to the genre's big resurgence in Europe at the time.

Reception

UEFA Euro 2004: Portugal received "generally favorable reviews" on all platforms except the Xbox version, which received "average" reviews, according to the review aggregation website Metacritic. GameSpot favored its gameplay and options in comparison to FIFA 2004 and praised the Windows version in particular for the improved visuals and online multiplayer. IGN specially praised the sound design of the game, stating that "the commentary is spot-on and not often repetitive, as we've come to expect. What's really impressive, however, is the crowd noise. Country-specific chants are a nice touch, and the din of the crowd overall is synched well with the action on the field."

However, the PlayStation 2 version was criticized for its inferior graphics, frame rate issues, and lack of online multiplayer when compared to the Xbox and PC versions respectively.

Sales
UEFA Euro 2004: Portugal was a commercial success, selling over one million units during the first month after release.

References

External links
 
 
 
 

2004 video games
Cancelled GameCube games
Cancelled Game Boy Advance games
Cancelled N-Gage games
Windows games
Xbox games
PlayStation 2 games
Association football video games
Electronic Arts games
EA Sports games
Video games developed in Canada
UEFA Euro 2004
Video games set in 2004
Video games set in Europe
Video games set in Portugal
FIFA (video game series)
UEFA European Championship video games